The South West Wales Integrated Transport Consortium is an alliance of four unitary authorities in south west Wales: Pembrokeshire, Swansea, Neath Port Talbot and Carmarthenshire.  It is one of four transport consortia  supported by the Welsh Assembly Government.

Ministerial Advisory Group "Phase Two Report on Transport" (July 2009)

The future of SWWITCH and the other Regional Transport Consortiums in Wales was called into question by the Ministerial Advisory Group Report of July 2009. This Group, appointed by and reporting to the Deputy First Minister and Transport Minister Ieuan Wyn Jones stated that "The organisational arrangements for transport are unnecessarily complicated and the regional transport consortia represent an unnecessary tier in the structure." (Report summary).(http://wales.gov.uk/docs/det/publications/090715ministerialadvisorygroupphase2reportontransport.pdf). 
The report was not accepted initially but operational funding was withdrawn from the regional transport consortiums  effective April 2014. All public transport functions reverted to the county authorities.

References

Transport in Carmarthenshire
Transport in Neath Port Talbot
Transport in Pembrokeshire
Transport in Swansea
Consortia in the United Kingdom
Local government in Wales